The Holocaust Memorial Center is a renovated synagogue that dates back to the 1920s and serves as a memorial and museum for and about Hungarian Jews that were murdered in the Holocaust. While largely focused on Jews, the museum also mentions the discrimination and killings of Romani, of homosexuals, and of the disabled. It is located in Budapest, Hungary.

The Holocaust Memorial Center is a former synagogue, the Páva Synagogue, at 39 Páva Utca, Budapest. It is a national institution established by the Government in 1999 and renovated and opened as the memorial and museum in 2004. It is the first Holocaust Memorial Center in Central Europe founded by a state. The museum was designed by architect István Mányi and Attila Gáti. Architecturally, the building is asymmetrical. A set of stairs lead visitors to the exhibitions, meant to "symbolize the distorted and twisted time of The Holocaust." There are permanent and temporary exhibits, and a research center. The research center offers people to search for their family member and have the chance to add to the list of names, increasing their database.

A wall in the courtyard of the Holocaust Memorial Center is inscribed with the names of 60,000 of Hungary's approximately 600,000 victims of the genocide.

Controversy
Following the victory of Viktor Orbán's Fidesz Party in the 2010 Hungarian parliamentary election, Andras Levente Gal was appointed to head the center. Paul A. Shapiro of the United States Holocaust Memorial Museum stated that Gal set out to eliminate any reference to Miklos Horthy, the Hungarian head of state who allied Hungary with Nazi Germany. Gal was accused of denying the involvement of the Hungarian state in the Holocaust, placing all the blame for the destruction of Hungarian Jewry on Germany. This led to an international outcry, following which Gal was sacked.

See also
 History of the Jews in Hungary

References

External links
Official website 
 Pava St. Synagogue in the Bezalel Narkiss Index of Jewish Art, Hebrew University of Jerusalem

Synagogues in Budapest
Museums in Budapest
Jews and Judaism in Budapest
Monuments and memorials in Hungary
Holocaust museums
2004 establishments in Hungary
Museums established in 2004